Auguste Matisse (22 May 1866 – 19 September 1931) was a French painter. His work was part of the painting event in the art competition at the 1928 Summer Olympics.

References

1866 births
1931 deaths
20th-century French painters
20th-century French male artists
French male painters
Olympic competitors in art competitions
People from Nevers